Sayf al-Din Ghazi (II) ibn Mawdud (full name: Sayf al-Din Ghazi II ibn Mawdud ibn Zengi; died 1180) was a Zangid Emir of Mosul, the nephew of Nur ad-Din Zengi. 

He became Emir of Mosul in 1170 after the death of his father Qutb ad-Din Mawdud. Saif had been chosen as the successor under the advice of eunuch ’Abd al-Masish, who wanted to keep the effective rule in lieu of the young emir; the disinherited son of Mawdud, Imad ad-Din Zengi II, fled to Aleppo at the court of Nur ad-Din. The latter, who was waiting for an excuse to annex Mosul, conquered Sinjar in September 1170 and besieged Mosul, which surrendered on 22 January 1171. After ousting al-Masish, he put Gümüshtekin, one of his officers, as governor, leaving Saif ud-Din nothing but the nominal title of emir. The latter also married the daughter of Nur ad-Din. 

At Nur ad-Din's death (May 1174), Gümüshtekin went to Damascus to take control of his son and entitled himself of atabeg of Aleppo. Saif ud-Din rejected his tutorage and restored his independence. The nobles of Damascus, worried by Gümüshtekin's increasing power, offered Saif ud-Din their city, but he could not intervene since he was busy in retaking Mosul. Thenceforth Damascus was given to Saladin.

Saladin took control of Biladu-Sham (Syria) but Saif ud-Din wanted to take over Aleppo, so he sent his brother Izz ad-Din Mas'ud at the head of an army to fight Saladin: they met in an area near Hama called Kron Hama (Arabic: قرون حماه) where Saif ud-Din was defeated. Later he prepared for another battle at Tell al-Sultan (Arabic: تل سلطان) near Aleppo, where he was also defeated; he went back to Mosul and sent messengers to Saladin offering his alliance, which was accepted.

Saif ud-Din died from tuberculosis, and his brother Izz ad-Din Mas'ud succeeded him in 1180.

References

Sources

1180 deaths
Zengid emirs of Mosul
Muslims of the Crusades
12th-century deaths from tuberculosis
Year of birth unknown
12th-century monarchs in the Middle East
Tuberculosis deaths in Iraq